Forever Man is a compilation album by the British rock musician Eric Clapton and was released through Reprise Records.

Release
The pre-order for the compilation album started on March 17, 2015. People had the chance to pre-order the album through the official Eric Clapton website. When ordering the 3-CD and LP-version of the release, you could get a T-shirt with the album's cover, a cup and an 18″ × 24″ lithograph. On the first day of the album announcement more than 37,000 copies were pre-ordered. With the total pre-order sales being added up, Forever Man reached position ten on the American pre-order chart. Until the actual release in the United States of the album on 28 April 2015, the compilation was pre-ordered more than 151,000 times. In Venezuela the album has been available since April 28, and has sold more than 5,000 copies, becoming a gold record in the first two days. The same release day was set for the United States, Canada and Mexico. In Germany the album was released on May 8. In Italy and Malaysia Forever Man was released one day after the German release date. In the southeastern state, the album quickly sold 7,500 copies in week one becoming a gold record. For the rest of the world the album was made available on May 11.

Track listings

Double and triple CD/Digital download versions

Double LP version

Critical reception

German music expert Günter Schneidewind recalls the compilation as "abundant piece of work" and thinks that the album shows "Claptons life-long work pretty well". AllMusic called this Clapton compilation the "by far the most extensive". They critique the track listings of the album saying they "make sense on paper but they're a little odd in practice, with the Studio selections hopscotching between eras and the live heavy on new millennial selections". Going on by recalling it "hardly a botched collection", they round their review up positively recalling the album "delivers a lot of bang for the buck".

Charts and certifications

Weekly charts

Year-end charts

Certifications

References

External links

Eric Clapton compilation albums
2015 compilation albums
Reprise Records compilation albums